Space velocity may refer to:

 Space velocity (astronomy), the velocity of a star in the galactic coordinate system
 Space velocity (chemistry), the relation between volumetric flow rate and reactor volume in a chemical reactor